Innoventions may refer to:

 Innoventions (Epcot), at Walt Disney World in Florida
 Innoventions (Disneyland), in California